Amaturá is a municipality located in the Brazilian state of Amazonas. Its population was 11,736 (2020), up from 8,694 in 2008, but its area has remained constant at 4,759 km2.

The municipality contains parts of the Jutaí-Solimões Ecological Station.

References

https://en.wikipedia.org/w/index.php?title=Amatur%C3%A1&action=edit

Municipalities in Amazonas (Brazilian state)
Populated places on the Amazon